Heinrich Palaszczuk (born 12 January 1947) is a former Labor member of the Legislative Assembly of Queensland, and minister of the Beattie Government of Queensland. He was elected as the member for Archerfield in 1984, and held that seat until his election as the member for Inala in 1992. Palaszczuk retired from politics in 2006, and was succeeded in his seat of Inala by his daughter Annastacia Palaszczuk, who has been the Premier of Queensland since 2015.

Early life and career
Palaszczuk was born in Germany to Polish parents. His family moved to Queensland when he was young.  Prior to entering politics, he earned a Diploma of Education  and became a school teacher. From 1980 to 1987, he was a secretary of the Inala Branch of the Labor Party, and served as the president of various electorate committees for state and federal government. Between 1985 and 1993, he worked as the campaign director on elections for the City of Brisbane and the federal electoral division of Rankin.

Member of parliament
As a member of parliament, Palaszczuk served on numerous committees, including the Estimates Committee and Standing Orders Committee, as well as being a Deputy Government Whip between 1990 and 1992.

When the Goss Labor Government was re-elected in 1995, the Labor caucus nominated Palaszczuk for speaker, to replace the sitting Labor speaker Jim Fouras. Labor later voted for Fouras in parliament, however, due to fears that Fouras would be re-elected as speaker with the support of the Nationals and Liberals. Wanting to avoid the controversy of Fouras crossing the floor to elect himself as speaker, Labor decided to support him instead of Palaszczuk.

Shadow Cabinet
After the fall of the Goss Government in February 1996, Palaszczuk joined the Opposition front bench as Shadow Minister for Natural Resources and Multicultural and Ethnic Affairs, later moving to Primary Industries.

Beattie Government Minister

When the Beattie Labor Government was elected in 1998, Palaszczuk was appointed Minister for Primary Industries. In 1999, he was also appointed Minister for Rural Communities. Following the 2004 election, he was appointed Minister for Primary Industries and Fisheries. When Terry Mackenroth resigned as Treasurer and Deputy Premier in 2005, he was appointed Minister for Natural Resources and Mines, and in 2006 he had Water added to his portfolio.

He continued in cabinet until he retired at the 2006 election.

Personal life
Palaszczuk is married, and has four daughters, including Premier Annastacia Palaszczuk, who represents the same seat, Inala. He lives in Brisbane.

References

Australian people of Polish descent
1947 births
Living people
Members of the Queensland Legislative Assembly
Australian Labor Party members of the Parliament of Queensland
21st-century Australian politicians